The 2012 Vietnamese National Football First League season was the 18th season of Vietnam's professional football league. It began on 30 December 2011 and finished on 18 August 2012.

Đồng Tâm Long An is winner.

Teams

Stadia and locations

Managerial changes

League table

Results

References

External links
 Vietnam Football Federation

Second level Vietnamese football league seasons
2
Viet
Viet